Laura Lu Scherer Copenhaver (August 29, 1868 – December 18, 1940) was an American businesswoman.

Copenhaver was a native of Marion, Virginia, where her father, the Reverend John Jacob Scherer, was the first president of Marion College. She was a writer, collaborating with her younger sister, Katharine Killinger Scherer Cronk, on fiction, poetry, and church pageants; her poem "Heralds of Christ" became a popular hymn. Copenhaver was the director of information for the Virginia Farm Bureau Federation,  and in that role advanced the agricultural economy of southwestern Virginia. In this role she emphasized cooperative marketing of farm products, and herself was involved in the same practice by producing textiles out of her home, Rosemont, hiring local women to craft coverlets based on traditional patterns, using locally produced wool. Copenhaver pressed her local Women's Missionary Society to establish the Konnarock Training School, which offered entry-level academic and religious education to children who could not attend the regular schools, and which opened in 1925.

Copenhaver was the mother-in-law of Sherwood Anderson, and was long active as a lay leader in the Lutheran Church. After her death her sister Minerva May Scherer headed Rosemont Industries for two decades; in 1960 some of her children incorporated it as Laura Copenhaver Industries, Inc. Copenhaver was one of the Virginia Women in History inducted by the Library of Virginia in 2007.

References

External links
 

1868 births
1940 deaths
American Lutherans
20th-century American businesspeople
20th-century American businesswomen
American women philanthropists
People from Marion, Virginia
Businesspeople from Virginia
Philanthropists from Virginia
19th-century American women writers
20th-century American women writers
Writers from Virginia
American women hymnwriters